The Bolshoy Kuranah mine is one of the largest gold mines in Russia and in the world. The mine is located in Sakha Republic. The mine has estimated reserves of 7.4 million oz of gold.

See also 
 List of mines in Russia

References 

Gold mines in Russia